General elections were held in India to constitute the 5th Lok Sabha in March 1971. The 27 Indian states and union territories were represented by 518 constituencies, each with a single seat. Under the leadership of Indira Gandhi, the Indian National Congress (R) led a campaign which focused on reducing poverty and won a landslide victory, overcoming a split in the party and regaining many of the seats lost in the previous election.

In Gujarat, INC and the new party NCO won 11 seats each while the Swatantra party only managed to get 2 seats.

Party-wise results summary

Results- Constituency wise

References

Indian general elections in Gujarat
Gujarat
1970s in Gujarat